Potito Starace is the defending champion, but lost in the first round.
Martin Kližan won the title, defeating Simone Bolelli 6–3, 6–1 in the final.

Seeds

Draw

Finals

Top half

Bottom half

References
 Main Draw
 Qualifying Draw

San Marino CEPU Open - Singles
San Marino CEPU Open